Bellemont is a populated place in Pottawatomie County, Oklahoma at an elevation of 1,047 feet.  It is located less than 7 miles west-southwest of Prague, Oklahoma.  

Bellemont was one of the possible birthplaces of Jim Thorpe, Olympian in the Stockholm 1912 Olympic Games.

References

Unincorporated communities in Pottawatomie County, Oklahoma
Unincorporated communities in Oklahoma